Charles Ford may refer to:

Government
 Charles Ford (British politician) (1845–1918), British politician
 Charles Ford (California politician), member of the 1861–62 California State Assembly
 Charles Ford (Oklahoma politician), American politician
 Charles A. Ford (born 1950), American ambassador to Honduras
 Charles Wilbraham Watson Ford (1896–1972), officer in the British Indian Army during World War II

Sports
 Charlie Ford (American football) (born 1948), cornerback
 Charlie Ford (golfer) (born 1985), English golfer

Media
 Charles E. Ford (1899–1942), newsreel and film producer and director
 Charles Henri Ford (1908–2002), American poet and artist, editor of the Surrealist magazine View

Characters
 Charles Ford (OITNB), a fictional character in Orange Is the New Black

Other
 Charles Ford (outlaw) (1857–1884), member of the James Gang
 Charles Ford (trade unionist) (1923–2000), British trade union leader
 Charles Edmund Ford (1912–1999), English biologist
 Charles Reginald Ford (1880–1972), New Zealand explorer, land agent, and architect